Barry Fagan (born c. 1955) is a former American football player and coach. He was the head football coach at Wayne State University in Detroit, Michigan from 1997 to 1999. Fagan was the first head football coach at Ave Maria University in Ave Maria, Florida, serving one season in 2011.

Head coaching record

College

References

Year of birth missing (living people)
1950s births
Living people
Ave Maria Gyrenes football coaches
Ferris State Bulldogs football coaches
Hillsdale Chargers football coaches
Penn State Nittany Lions football players
Wayne State Warriors football coaches
High school football coaches in Michigan
University of Wisconsin–Madison alumni